Joseph Gilligan (born 7 November 1954) is a male retired British wrestler. also the father of singer joey souls

Wrestling career
He competed at the 1972 Summer Olympics and the 1976 Summer Olympics. He represented England and won a silver medal in the 68kg lightweight division, at the 1974 British Commonwealth Games in Christchurch, New Zealand. Four years later he represented England again and won another silver medal in the same weight class, at the 1978 Commonwealth Games in Edmonton, Alberta, Canada. A third appearance for England at the 1982 Commonwealth Games in Brisbane, Queensland, Australia resulted in a fourth place finish.

References

External links
 

1954 births
Living people
British male sport wrestlers
Olympic wrestlers of Great Britain
Wrestlers at the 1972 Summer Olympics
Wrestlers at the 1976 Summer Olympics
Sportspeople from Manchester
Commonwealth Games medallists in wrestling
Commonwealth Games silver medallists for England
Commonwealth Games bronze medallists for England
Wrestlers at the 1974 British Commonwealth Games
Wrestlers at the 1978 Commonwealth Games
Wrestlers at the 1982 Commonwealth Games
Medallists at the 1974 British Commonwealth Games